= Primestar 500 =

Two different NASCAR races have been known as the Primestar 500:

- Primestar 500 (Atlanta), held at Atlanta Motor Speedway in March in 1997 and 1998
- Primestar 500 (Texas), held at Texas Motor Speedway in March 1999
